The 2022–23 Coupe de France is the 106th season of the main football cup competition of France. The competition is organised by the French Football Federation (FFF) and is open to all clubs in French football, as well as clubs from the overseas departments and territories (Guadeloupe, French Guiana, Martinique, Mayotte, New Caledonia, Tahiti, Réunion, Saint Martin, and Saint Pierre and Miquelon).

Nantes are the defending champions, after beating Nice 1–0 to claim their fourth Coupe de France title.

Dates
Dates for the first two qualifying rounds, and any preliminaries required, were set by the individual Regional leagues. From round three, the FFF defined the calendar, with rounds up to and including the round of 32 being scheduled for weekends and later rounds up to, but not including, the final, taking place on midweek evenings. Due to the 2022 FIFA World Cup taking place in November and December, it was necessary to bring forward the eighth round by a week, compared to previous seasons, impacting the scheduling of earlier rounds. Similarly the timeline of rounds from the round of 64 onwards was compressed.

Teams

Round 1 to 6

The first six rounds, and any preliminaries required, were organised by the Regional Leagues and the Overseas Territories, who allowed teams from within their league structure to enter at any point up to the third round. Teams from Championnat National 3 entered at the third round, those from Championnat National 2 entered at the fourth round and those from Championnat National entered at the fifth round.

The number of teams entering at each qualifying round was as follows:

Round 7
The 145 qualifiers from the Regional Leagues were joined by the 10 qualifiers from the Overseas Territories and 20 2022–23 Ligue 2 teams. The qualifiers from Réunion, Martinique, Guadeloupe and French Guiana played off in internal matches.

Ligue 2

 Amiens
 Annecy
 Bastia
 Bordeaux
 Caen
 Dijon
 Grenoble

 Guingamp
 Laval
 Le Havre
 Metz
 Nîmes
 Niort
 Quevilly-Rouen

 Paris FC
 Pau
 Rodez
 Saint-Étienne
 Sochaux
 Valenciennes

Regional Leagues

Nouvelle Aquitaine (13 teams)
 Angoulême Charente FC (4)
 Bergerac Périgord FC (4)
 Stade Bordelais (4)
 Trélissac FC (4)
 SO Châtellerault (5)
 US Lège Cap Ferret (5)
 Stade Poitevin FC (5)
 FC Chauray (6)
 FC Lescar (6)
 FCE Mérignac Arlac (6)
 SA Mérignac (6)
 Entente Boé Bon-Encontre (7)
 AS Merpins (7)

Pays de la Loire (11 teams)
 SO Cholet (3)
 Le Mans FC (3)
 Voltigeurs de Châteaubriant (4)
 Les Herbiers VF (4)
 Sablé FC (5)
 NDC Angers (6)
 AC Basse-Goulaine (6)
 JSC Bellevue Nantes (6)
 AS La Châtaigneraie (6)
 Orvault SF (6)
 Mareuil SC (7)

Centre-Val de Loire (6 teams)
 LB Châteauroux (3)
 Bourges Foot 18 (4)
 Saint-Pryvé Saint-Hilaire FC (4)
 Vierzon FC (4)
 Avoine OCC (5)
 FC Saint-Doulchard (7)

Corsica (2 teams)
 FC Borgo (3)
 GC Lucciana (5)

Bourgogne-Franche-Comté (8 teams)
 ASM Belfort (4)
 Jura Sud Foot (4)
 Louhans-Cuiseaux FC (4)
 Union Cosnoise Sportive (5)
 FC Gueugnon (5)
 Jura Dolois Football (5)
 UF Mâconnais (5)
 ASC Saint-Apollinaire (5)

Grand Est (19 teams)
 AS Nancy Lorraine (3)
 SAS Épinal (4)
 FCSR Haguenau (4)
 AS Prix-lès-Mézières (5)
 US Raon-l'Étape (5)
 EF Reims Sainte-Anne (5)
 US Sarre-Union (5)
 ES Thaon (5)
 ES Gandrange (6)
 FC Geispolsheim 01 (6)
 AS Illzach Modenheim (6)
 SC Marnaval (6)
 US Reipertswiller (6)
 FC Saint-Louis Neuweg (6)
 FCO Strasbourg Koenigshoffen 06 (6)
 ES Villerupt-Thil (6)
 ES Heillecourt (7)
 SSEP Hombourg-Haut (7)
 COS Villers (7)

Méditerranée (5 teams)
 Aubagne FC (4)
 ÉFC Fréjus Saint-Raphaël (4)
 RC Grasse (4)
 Hyères FC (4)
 SC Toulon (4)

Occitanie (10 teams)
 Olympique Alès (4)
 RCO Agde (5)
 US Salinières Aigues Mortes (5)
 FC Alberes Argelès (5)
 US Colomiers Football (5)
 Onet-le-Château Football (5)
 FC Biars-Bretenoux (6)
 FU Narbonne (6)
 Union Saint-Estève EspoirPerpignan Méditerannée Métropole (6)
 Montauban FCTG (7)

Hauts-de-France (20 teams)
 USL Dunkerque (3)
 AS Beauvais Oise (4)
 FC Chambly Oise (4)
 Olympique Saint-Quentin (4)
 Wasquehal Football (4)
 Entente Feignies Aulnoye FC (5)
 Olympique Marcquois Football (5)
 Stade Béthunois (6)
 AC Cambrai (6)
 US Pays de Cassel (6)
 CS Chaumont-en-Vexin (6)
 US Escaudain (6)
 FC Loon-Plage (6)
 US Le Pays du Valois (6)
 Bondues FC (7)
 US Pont Sainte-Maxence (7)
 FC Liancourt-Clermont (8)
 JA Armentières (9)
 CA Éperlecques (9)
 US Téteghem (9)

Normandy (8 teams)
 US Avranches (3)
 Évreux FC 27 (4)
 US Granville (4)
 US Alençon (5)
 Grand-Quevilly FC (5)
 CMS Oissel (5)
 AF Virois (5)
 Le Havre Caucriauville Sportif (7)

Brittany (14 teams)
 US Concarneau (3)
 US Saint-Malo (4)
 Vannes OC (4)
 US Fougères (5)
 Lannion FC (5)
 Stade Plabennécois (5)
 AS Vitré (5)
 Auray FC (6)
 Espérance Chartres-de-Bretagne (6)
 PD Ergué-Gabéric (6)
 AG Plouvorn (6)
 Stade Pontivyen (6)
 US Grégorienne (7)
 Séné FC (7)

Paris-Île-de-France (10 teams)
 Paris 13 Atletico (3)
 Red Star F.C. (3)
 FC Fleury 91 (4)
 AS Poissy (4)
 FCM Aubervilliers (5)
 JA Drancy (5)
 CO Les Ulis (5)
 ESA Linas-Montlhéry (5)
 AC Paris 15 (7)
 Marcoussis Nozay La-Ville-du-Bois FC (9)

Auvergne-Rhône-Alpes (19 teams)
 Le Puy Foot 43 Auvergne (3)
 FC Villefranche Beaujolais (3)
 Andrézieux-Bouthéon FC (4)
 FC Chamalières (4)
 Lyon La Duchère (4)
 AS Saint-Priest (4)
 FC Bourgoin-Jallieu (5)
 Chambéry SF (5)
 US Feurs (5)
 FC Limonest Dardilly Saint-Didier (5)
 GFA Rumilly-Vallières (5)
 FC Vaulx-en-Velin (5)
 SA Thiers (6)
 Velay FC (6)
 Vénissieux FC (6)
 FC Cournon-d'Auvergne (7)
 FC Roche-Saint-Genest (7)
 AS Savigneux-Montbrison (7)
 ES Tarentaise (7)

Overseas Territories teams

 French Guiana: 2 teams
 ASU Grand Santi
 Le Geldar De Kourou
 Réunion: 2 teams
 La Tamponnaise
 JS Saint-Pierroise

 Martinique: 2 teams
 Golden Lion FC
 Aiglon du Lamentin FC
 Guadeloupe: 2 teams
 L'Etoile de Morne-à-l'Eau
 SC Baie-Mahault

 Mayotte: 1 team
 Diables Noirs
 Tahiti: 1 team
 A.S. Vénus
 New Caledonia: 1 team
 Hienghène Sport

Mainland teams willing to travel overseas
The team from Tahiti played their seventh round tie at home. On 18 October 2022 the list of National, National 2 and National 3 clubs who had put themselves forward as candidates for overseas travel was published. Teams not selected were included in the draw for overseas travel in the eighth round, should they have qualified.

 US Avranches (3)
 FC Fleury 91 (4)
 Angoulême Charente FC (4)
 ASM Belfort (4)
 Évreux FC 27 (4)
 ASC Saint-Apollinaire (5)

 FCM Aubervilliers (5)
 CMS Oissel (5)
 Union Cosnoise Sportive (5)
 US Sarre-Union (5)
 CO Les Ulis (5)

Round 8
The eighth round ties for mainland matches was made at the same time as the seventh round draw. Matches including the teams from Martinique and Guadeloupe were slotted into the draw where gaps appear due to teams being selected to travel overseas.

Prioritised order of mainland teams
The winners of the seventh round matches in Réunion and French Guiana played their eighth round match at home against teams from mainland France. A draw on 18 October 2022 prioritised the list of clubs for these fixtures, should they win their seventh round games. FCM Aubervilliers and Évreux FC 27 were the highest in the list to qualify for the eighth round.

Round of 64
The 44 qualifying teams from Round 8 were joined by the 20 2022–23 Ligue 1 teams. 32 ties were drawn in regional groups.

 Ajaccio
 Angers
 Auxerre
 Brest
 Clermont
 Lens
 Lille

 Lorient
 Lyon
 Marseille
 Monaco
 Montpellier
 Nantes
 Nice

 Paris Saint-Germain
 Reims
 Rennes
 Strasbourg
 Toulouse
 Troyes

Later rounds
Later rounds are open draws with no regional grouping.

Seventh round
The draw for the seventh round took place in multiple stages:
 The seventh round in Guadeloupe, Martinique, French Guiana and Réunion will take place between the two qualifying teams from each territory, and were drawn and scheduled by the local league.
 The Overseas tie involving the team from Tahiti was drawn separately on 18 October 2022, against a team from the list of those willing to travel.
 Mainland teams were divided into ten groups, by geography and to ensure the groups are balanced in terms of the levels of the teams. The draw took place on 19 October 2022.

Overseas playoff ties

Overseas teams hosting mainland teams
This tie was drawn on 18 October 2022, and was played on the weekend of 30 October 2022.

Mainland ties
These ties were drawn on 19 October 2022, and were originally scheduled to be played on the weekend of 30 October 2022.

Group 7A

Group 7B

Group 7C

Group 7D

Group 7E

Group 7F

Group 7G

Group 7H

Group 7I

Group 7J

Eighth round
The draw for the eighth round took place at the same time as the seventh round, with seventh round ties being paired together. Ties were originally scheduled to take place on the weekend of 18, 19 and 20 November 2022.

Group 8A

Group 8B

Group 8C

Group 8D

Group 8E

Group 8F

Group 8G

Group 8H

Group 8I

Group 8J

Round of 64
The draw was made on 21 November 2022, with the qualifying teams divided into four regional groups, and the 20 Ligue 1 teams divided equally amongst the groups. Ties were originally scheduled to take place on the weekend of 6, 7 and 8 January 2023.

Group A

Group B

Group C

Group D

Round of 32
The draw was made on 8 January 2023. Ties took place between 20 and 23 January 2023.

Round of 16
The draw was made on 23 January 2023. The ties took place on 8 and 9 February 2023.

Quarter-finals
The draw was made on 9 February 2023.

Semi-finals
The draw was made on 2 March 2023.

Final

Top scorers

References

External links

 
France
Cup
Coupe de France seasons